Joe Cormack (born 30 August 1966) is a former Australian rules footballer who played for the West Coast Eagles and Fitzroy in the Victorian/Australia Football League (VFL/AFL).

West Coast recruited Cormack from Swan Districts, where he had played since 1986. He spent two seasons with the West Coast Eagles but was unable to cement his spot in the team and was traded to Fitzroy, for Dale Kickett. At a much weaker club, Cormack was able to get regular games and when Fitzroy defeated Sydney at the SCG in 1992, his two goals and 31 disposals earned him three Brownlow Medal votes.

Cormark was a Western Australian State of Origin representative at the 1988 Adelaide Bicentennial Carnival.

References

Holmesby, Russell and Main, Jim (2007). The Encyclopedia of AFL Footballers. 7th ed. Melbourne: Bas Publishing.

1966 births
Living people
West Coast Eagles players
Fitzroy Football Club players
Swan Districts Football Club players
Western Australian State of Origin players
Australian rules footballers from Western Australia
People from Bunbury, Western Australia